Strängnäs Municipality (Strängnäs kommun) is a municipality in Södermanland County in eastern Sweden, located by Lake Mälaren. Its seat is located in the city of Strängnäs.

The present municipality was created in 1971, when the City of Strängnäs was amalgamated with the City of Mariefred and a number of rural municipalities. Originally there were 15 local government entities in the area.

Localities
The municipality consists of the old towns of Strängnäs and Mariefred and the villages of Åkers styckebruk and Stallarholmen. 
Strängnäs (seat)
Mariefred
Åkers styckebruk
Stallarholmen

History
Strängnäs is an old town with a history dating back to the Viking era. Its location on the shores of Lake Mälaren has made Strängnäs an important trading centre and meeting place through the ages.

Mariefred acquired its name from the monastery Pax Mariae ("Mary's Peace") which was founded some 500 years ago by Sten Sture the Elder. There are no remains above ground of the monastery, which was the location where Mariefred's church, built in 1624, now stands.

Economy
Strängnäs has a multifaceted and dynamic economy, being home to businesses of different sizes and in many different sectors. The prominent industries are biotech, pharmaceuticals, logistics, education, engineering and tourism.

Elections

Riksdag
These are the results of the Riksdag elections of Strängnäs Municipality since the 1972 municipality reform. The results of the Sweden Democrats were not published by SCB between 1988 and 1998 at a municipal level to the party's small nationwide size at the time.

Blocs

This lists the relative strength of the socialist and centre-right blocs since 1973, but parties not elected to the Riksdag are inserted as "other", including the Sweden Democrats results from 1988 to 2006, but also the Christian Democrats pre-1991 and the Greens in 1982, 1985 and 1991. The sources are identical to the table above. The coalition or government mandate marked in bold formed the government after the election. New Democracy got elected in 1991 but are still listed as "other" due to the short lifespan of the party. "Elected" is the total number of percentage points from the municipality that went to parties who were elected to the Riksdag.

Twin towns – sister cities

Strängnäs is twinned with:

 Kandava, Latvia
 Kisko (Salo), Finland
 Loiborsoit (Lolkisale), Tanzania
 Muurla (Salo), Finland
 Olsztynek, Poland
 Priozersk, Russia
 Ratzeburg, Germany
 Rheinsberg, Germany
 Ribe, Denmark
 Saku, Estonia
 Sauvo, Finland
 Sogndal, Norway

References

External links

Strängnäs Municipality - Official site

 
Municipalities of Södermanland County